Sagala language may be:
Saghala language (Northern Sagala, Kenya)
Sagara language (Southern Sagala, Tanzania)